Xie Molin (Chinese: 谢墨凛; born 1979) is a contemporary Chinese artist currently working and living in Beijing, China. He is best known for creating paintings using a tri-axial linkage painting machine.

Background 
After living in Wenzhou, a city in the Zhejiang Province of China, Xie Molin moved to Beijing in 1995 to attend the attached school of the China Central Academy of Fine Arts (CAFA). He graduated from the Mural Department of CAFA and obtained an M.F.A from the painting department of the Edinburgh College of Art.

Career 
Upon arriving back to Beijing Xie Molin participated in several group exhibitions including the CAFAM Future Exhibition at the CAFA Museum, ON/OFF: China's Young Artists in Concept and Practice at the Ullens Center for Contemporary Art (UCCA), Pull Left-Not Always Right at the Urban Arts Space at Ohio State University and at the Hillstrom Museum of Gustavus Adolphus College in Minnesota, 28 Chinese at the Rubell Family Collection in Miami, Focus Beijing: De Heus-Zomer Collection at the Museum Bojimans Van Beuningen in Rotterdam, Leaving Realism Behind at Pace Gallery in Beijing and A Victory Over Nothingness: Purse Snatch in Streetcar and Other Post Fevralist Absurdities at Intelligentsia Gallery in Beijing.

Xie Molin's work has been featured in solo shows at Pace Hong Kong, the Beijing Commune, and at Space Station in Beijing.

References

External links 
Xie Molin – Pace Gallery
Xie Molin – 北京公社 Beijing Commune
Official Website

1979 births
Living people
Chinese contemporary artists
Painters from Zhejiang
Artists from Wenzhou
Alumni of the Edinburgh College of Art